Pluronic P123 is a symmetric triblock copolymer comprising poly(ethylene oxide) (PEO) and poly(propylene oxide) (PPO) in an alternating linear fashion, PEO-PPO-PEO. The unique characteristic of PPO block, which is hydrophobic at temperatures above 288 K and is soluble in water at temperatures below 288 K, leads to the formation of micelle consisting of PEO-PPO-PEO triblock copolymers. Some studies report that the hydrophobic core contains PPO block, and a hydrophilic corona consists of PEO block. In 30wt% aqueous solution Pluronic P123 forms a cubic gel phase.

The nominal chemical formula of P123 is HO(CH2CH2O)20(CH2CH(CH3)O)70(CH2CH2O)20H, which corresponds to a molecular weight of around 5800 g/mol. Triblock copolymers based on PEO-PPO-PEO chains are known generically as poloxamer.

Poloxamers have behaviors similar to those of hydrocarbon surfactants, and will form micelles when placed in a selective solvent such as water. They can form both spherical and cylindrical micelles

Uses
P123 has been used in the synthesis of mesoporous materials including FDU-14. Dissolved P-123 forms micelles that are used as the backbone to make structured mesoporous materials such as SBA-15.

References

Copolymers